The 2009 Seattle mayoral election took place November 3, 2009.  Incumbent Seattle mayor Greg Nickels sought reelection but finished third in the August 18, 2009 primary election. The general election was instead between Joe Mallahan and Michael McGinn.  McGinn beat Mallahan in the election with 51% of the vote share, becoming Seattle's next mayor.

Background
In a November 2008 poll of likely Seattle voters, 31% of voters approved of Nickels's performance as mayor while 57% disapproved. A January 2009 poll found a net job approval of minus 33.

Nickels' administration was faulted for not doing enough to prevent the Seattle SuperSonics NBA franchise from relocating to Oklahoma City, Oklahoma. Nickels was also heavily criticized for the city's policy of not using salt for snow removal due to potential environmental concerns, which contributed to the city's congested traffic in December 2008 after one of the greatest snowfalls in the city since 1996. The Proposed replacement of the Alaskan Way Viaduct and a tax on plastic bags at grocery stores were also major issues of the campaign.

Primary candidates (in alphabetic order)

Elizabeth Campbell, Magnolia resident and activist
James Donaldson, former Seattle SuperSonics player 
Jan Drago, Seattle City Councilwoman
Kwame Garrett
Joe Mallahan, Vice President for T-Mobile, a cellular communications company headquartered in Bellevue, Washington.
Michael McGinn, Sierra Club leader and activist 
Greg Nickels, Seattle Mayor since 2001
Norman Sigler, former Alaska Airlines manager

Joe Mallahan 
Joe Mallahan is a telecommunications executive, former Chicago community organizer and unsuccessful candidate in the 2009 Seattle mayoral election. In preliminary results in the August 18 primary, he and Michael McGinn received the greatest number of votes and, as a result of Washington State's nonpartisan blanket primary system, became the two candidates in the November 3, 2009 general election.

Biography
Joe Mallahan was born and raised in Everett and is the seventh of nine children. He completed his undergraduate studies in American politics at The Catholic University of America in Washington, D.C., where he worked during college as a legislative aide to Washington State Democratic Congressman Al Swift. He also holds a master's degree in East Asian Studies from the Jackson School of International Studies at the University of Washington and an MBA from the University of Chicago. During his studies for his master's degree from the University of Washington Mallahan spent a year in a fellowship at the Japanese Ministry of Education conducting research on economic development aid. Joe is married to Carolyn Mallahan, who he has two daughters with, Irina and Masha. Both Joe and Carolyn Mallahan are volunteers and major fundraisers for the AmeriCorps organization City Year. The family lives in Seattle's Wallingford neighborhood.

Professional career
Mallahan began his career working at an auditing firm in Chicago and then for Century Supply Company, where company executives were sufficiently impressed with his suggestions for improving efficiency  to appoint him President of the company in 1995 at age 31. He later worked for cell-phone service provider VoiceStream, which was purchased by T-Mobile and brought Mallahan and his family back to Seattle in 2000. He was Vice President of Operations Strategy at T-Mobile.  Joe left T-Mobile in 2011 to pursue other opportunities.

Political Activism
Mallahan began his political activism in Chicago while working as the President of Century Supply Company. There Mallahan helped establish United Power for Action and Justice and received training and work as a community organizer from the Industrial Areas Foundation. After returning to Seattle in 2000 Mallahan worked on fellow Industrial Areas Foundation alumnus Barack Obama's presidential campaign but it was not until the 2009 Seattle mayoral race that he ran for political office. In addition to his work earlier work with Representative Al Swift Mallhan later worked as a legislative aide to Washington Republican Senator Slade Gorton. Since his return to Seattle and registering to vote in April 2000 elections records in King County show that Mallahan had voted in 12 of the 25 elections he was eligible to participate in.

2009 Seattle Mayoral Campaign
On April 29, 2009 Mallahan declared his candidacy in an open letter to Seattle Mayor Greg Nickles declaring city government broken, no longer providing basic services and that Nickels was out of touch. In an effort to match Nickles' already existing $280,000 campaign reserves Mallahan committed $200,000 of his own money to his campaign. In between declaring his candidacy and the primary elections Mallahan raised nearly $200,000 in additional contributions from independent sources. After successfully passing the primary election Mallahan personally contributed approximately $30,000 in additional funds and raised another $130,000 from independent sources. Mallahan received substantial criticism from people such as Mike McGinn and Washington State Senator Ed Murray who accused him of "buying his way into the campaign". On November 9 Mallahan conceded the election to Mike McGinn after losing by a margin of less than one percent.

Campaign finances

Primaries

Early polling
A poll conducted on August 12 showed incumbent Greg Nickels in the lead with 24 percent voter backing. While Nickels had a significant lead over all other candidates, the undecided voter percentage of 26 percent indicated room for any candidate to take the lead in the primary held on August 18. In second place after Greg Nickels was Mike McGinn with 16 percent. And in third place, Joe Mallahan with 14 percent. The survey polled 500 people with a margin of error of + or - 4.3 percent.

Primary results
The primary election was held on August 18. The final results were posted on September 2, and showed Mike McGinn in first place with 27.7 percent of the popular vote, narrowly leading Joe Mallahan standing at 26.9 percent. Incumbent Greg Nickels showed with 25.4 percent. Due to Washington's top-two primary system, this eliminated Nickels from the running. Nickels gave his concession speech on August 21 at Seattle City Hall. Mallahan and McGinn advanced to the general election in November.

General election
An October 20 poll commissioned by KING-TV and conducted by SurveyUSA showed Joe Mallahan ahead with 43% to Michael McGinn's 36% with a margin of error of 4.1%.  Mallahan held a lead among college graduates, Democrats, Republicans, Independents and those describing themselves as moderates and conservatives. McGinn was shown to hold a lead among Asian-Americans, younger voters and those that describe themselves as liberals. McGinn changed his position on the Deep Bore Tunnel that same day, claiming "If I'm elected mayor, though I disagree with this decision, it will be my job to uphold and execute this agreement. It is not the mayor's job to withhold the cooperation of city government in executing this agreement."''  It was enough to push McGinn ahead of Mallahan by election day. 

Mallahan conceded on November 9 after his deficit grew to nearly 5,000 votes.

References

Seattle
2009
Seattle mayoral
Seattle mayoral